The Commonwealth Games Federation (CGF), currently known as Commonwealth Sport, is the international organisation responsible for the direction and control of the Commonwealth Games and Commonwealth Youth Games, and is governing body of the Commonwealth Games Associations (CGA). The headquarters of CGF are located in London, England.

History
Due to the success of the first 1930 British Empire Games in Hamilton, Canada, a meeting of representatives from Great Britain, its dominions, colonies and territories decided that the games, similar to the Olympic Games should be held every four years, and that an authoritative organisation should be formed. Following the 1932 Summer Olympics, it was decided to form the "British Empire Games Federation" who would be responsible for the organising of the games. The name of the federation was changed in 1952 to the "British Empire and Commonwealth Games Federation", and again in Jamaica in 1966 to the "British Commonwealth Games Federation", until eventually being changed again in Christchurch, New Zealand in 1974 to the "Commonwealth Games Federation".

The youth version of the Commonwealth Games was launched in August 2000, which is known as the Commonwealth Youth Games. The inaugural edition of the Commonwealth Youth Games was first held in Edinburgh, Scotland.

CGF Executive Board 
The following people are in the CGF executive board:

The following people are the Honorary members of the CGF executive board:

Organisation

CGF General Assembly
The General Assembly is the ultimate governance and authority in the CGF with powers to vote on decisions, including on which cities and Commonwealth Games Association's will host the Commonwealth Games. It consists of 3 or more representatives of a Commonwealth Games Association of each member countries and territories, the Vice-Patron, Life Vice-Presidents and the members of the Executive Board.

Sessions of the General Assembly are chaired by the CGF President, with each CGA and the President having one vote. However the Vice-Patron, Life Vice-Presidents, the Executive Board, representatives of an Organising Committee (OC) of a Commonwealth Games and observers invited by the President may deliberate but do not have voting powers at the General Assembly.

Honours 
As well as awarding medals to athletes, the federation may award membership of the Order of Merit for distinguished services rendered to the Commonwealth Games movement, including the games themselves, to the federation and to a Commonwealth Games Association. The honour is awarded on the recommendation of the Executive Board at the General Assembly.

On recommendation of the Executive Board, at General Assembly the federation may also elect Life Vice-Presidents, providing there are no more than six Life Vice-Presidents at a time as an award for services to the CGF. Former Chairmen and presidents automatically become a Life Vice-President.

Leadership
The President of the Commonwealth Games Federation is responsible for chairing the Executive Board and the General Assembly. A candidate is elected to the position by the General Assembly the year following the Commonwealth Games. Other duties include inviting the Head of the Commonwealth for the opening and closing declaration of the games and overseeing the preparations for upcoming events.

Previously before the XVI Commonwealth Games in 1998, the President was a ceremonial role, taking on the duties of the now Vice-Patron. Prince Philip, Duke of Edinburgh served as the president between 1955 and 1990. The chairman was elected by the General Assembly as head of the Commonwealth Games Federation.

See also
Global Association of International Sports Federations
International Olympic Committee

References

External links
[://www.commonwealthsport.com/ The CGF official website]
The CGF on Twitter

Federation
Games Federation
International sports organizations
International organisations based in London
Organisations based in the City of Westminster
Sport in the City of Westminster
Sports rules and regulations
1930 establishments in England
Sports organisations in London
Sports organizations established in 1930